The Arkham Collector: Volume I is a collection of the entire run of the magazine The Arkham Collector from 1967 to 1971. It was released in 1971 by Arkham House in an edition of 676 copies and was not jacketed.

References

1971 books